Illinois Route 43 (IL 43) is a  major north–south state highway in the U.S. state of Illinois. It runs from U.S. Route 30 (US 30) in Frankfort north to the large intersection of IL 120 (Belvidere Road) and US 41 (Skokie Highway) in Waukegan.

Route description 

IL 43 is called Waukegan Road for the first  until its intersection with Oakton Street in Niles; it then follows that road west one block until it turns back south and remains Harlem Avenue for the duration. When IL 50 begins in Skokie and IL 171 begins in Chicago, it parallels those routes for much of the rest of its length. It enters, exits, and runs parallel to Chicago limits several times, passing through or parallel to Edison Park, Norwood Park, Dunning, Montclare, and Austin on the Northwest Side then Garfield Ridge and Clearing on the Southwest Side. Listed as 7200 West in the Chicago address system, it is one of seven state roads that travel through the city of Chicago.

History 
IL 43 was originally part of what is now US 136 and IL 10 from Havana to Mason City. By 1935, IL 43 was moved to what is now IL 4 from Olive Township to Oraville. By 1964, IL 4 supplanted all of IL 43. In 1967, Illinois Route 42A, which originally followed Waukegan Road and Harlem Avenue, was decommissioned and was replaced by IL 43.

In Deerfield, IL 43 is designated a Blue Star Memorial Highway.

Major intersections

References

External links

 Illinois Highway Ends: Illinois Route 43

043
Monuments and memorials in Illinois
Transportation in Will County, Illinois
Transportation in Cook County, Illinois
Transportation in Lake County, Illinois
Transportation in Chicago
U.S. Route 136